Gymnosoma par is a Nearctic species of fly in the family Tachinidae.

References

Phasiinae
Diptera of North America
Insects described in 1849
Taxa named by Francis Walker (entomologist)